R. Doug Lewis has served as Executive Director of the Election Center since 1994. The Election Center is a nonprofit also known as the National Association of Election Officials, whose purpose is "to promote, preserve, and improve democracy."

Current positions
 Executive Director of the Election Center
 Election Assistance Commission Board of Advisors
 electionline.org Advisory Board
 Director of the Voting Systems Program for the National Association of State Election Directors (NASED)
 Member of the national Voting Systems Board and the California Internet Voting Advisory Committee

Testimony
 Testimony presented to the United States Election Assistance Commission Public Meeting, December 7, 2006
 Statement presented to the United States Election Assistance Commission Public Hearing, June 3, 2004
 Testimony for U.S. Senate Hearings On Disasters and Special Elections Senate Judiciary Committee Subcommittee on Constitution, September 9, 2003
 Testimony before the California Secretary of State's Ad Hoc Committee on Voter Verified Paper Ballots
 Testimony for Senate Government Affairs Committee, May 9, 2001

References

Election people
Living people
Year of birth missing (living people)